West Halmahera Regency is a regency (on Halmahera Island) in North Maluku Province, Indonesia. It covers an area of 2,080.21 km2, and it had a population of 100,424 people at the 2010 Census and 132,349 at the 2020 Census; the official estimate as at mid 2021 was 134,630. The capital lies at Jailolo.

Administration 
The regency is divided into eight districts (kecamatan), tabulated below with their areas and their populations at the 2010 Census and 2020 Census, together with the official estimates as at mid 2021. The table also includes the locations of the district administrative centres, the number of administrative villages (all classed as rural desa) in each district, and their postal codes.

Notes: (a) including 37 offshore islands. (b) including 80 offshore islands.

References

External links

Regencies of North Maluku
Halmahera